Omorgus foveolatus is a species of hide beetle in the subfamily Omorginae and subgenus Afromorgus.

References

foveolatus
Beetles described in 1860